The 2009 Women's National Invitation Tournament (WNIT) was a single-elimination tournament of 48 National Collegiate Athletic Association (NCAA) Division I teams that did not participate in the 2009 NCAA Division I women's basketball tournament. It was won by South Florida.  The 41st annual tournament was played from March 18, 2009 to April 4, 2009, entirely on campus sites. The highest ranked team in each conference that did not receive a bid to the NCAA Tournament received an automatic bid to this tournament. The remaining slots were filled by the WNIT Selection Committee.

The South Florida Bulls beat the Kansas Jayhawks, 75–71, in the championship game to win the WNIT. This was the first postseason championship of any kind for the Bulls women's basketball team. Danielle McCray of Kansas scored 147 points during the tournament, a WNIT record that still stands. Shantia Grace of South Florida was named tournament MVP.

Seeding
Teams are not seeded in the WNIT. Rather, teams are placed into one of three tiers. Teams in the upper tier are spread around the bracket as best as possible, although not every upper tier team receives a first round bye. Lower tier and middle tier teams tend to meet in the first round, while upper tier teams will usually play winners of first-round games in the second round. The organizers attempt to bracket the first two rounds based on geography. The location of games is determined in part by seed, but also by facility availability and other factors.

Participants

Sections

Final Four 
Kansas took on Illinois State in the first semifinal, held at Allen Fieldhouse. The first half was a back-and-forth battle, featuring three ties and nine lead changes. Kansas held a small six point lead at halftime. In the second half Kansas appeared to take charge, opening up a 17 point lead 48–31 with just over 13 minutes to go. The Redbirds did not go away, and chipped away at the lead, cutting it to single digits just after midway through the half, and down to a single point with three seconds to go in the game. With two seconds left, Danielle McCray was fouled and went to the line eating both free throws. Illinois State needed a three pointer to tie but turned it over with one second left in the game, leaving Kansas to take the win and head to the championship game. McCray led all scorers with 31 points.

South Florida took on Boston College in the other semifinal, held in Conte Forum in Chestnut Hill, Massachusetts. The game was very close for the first three quarters of the game with neither team holding more than a six point lead. Boston College hit a three-point jumper to make it a one point game midway through the second half, but did not score another field goal for over six minutes, allowing the Bulls to open up a 15 point lead. South Florida ended up with the win 82–65. Carolyn Swords led all scorers with 22 points in the losing effort, while Jasmine Wynne finished with 19 points for the Bulls.

South Florida faced Kansas in the championship game held at Allen Fieldhouse. The attendance was 16,113, representing not just a Kansas record but the largest home attendance for a women's game in Big 12 history. the Bulls opened up an early 10 point lead, but Kansas responded by taking back a small lead late in the first half. South Florida held Kansas scoreless for a four minute stretch allowing them to open up a 12 point lead early in the second half. Kansas cut the lead briefly to five points before the Bulls open the lead back up to double digits. The Jayhawks then held the Bulls scoreless for nearly three minutes and cut the lead to 67–66. The Bulls hit a bucket and a free throw to extend their lead to four, then Kansas turned it over when attempting to cut into the lead. South Florida ran out much of the remaining time and hit a shot from baseline to increase the margin to five points with less than 30 seconds to play. The Bulls ended up winning the championship 75–71. It was the first postseason championship for South Florida. Danielle McCray led all scorers with 24 points for Kansas.

Bracket
All times US EDT
† – Denotes overtime period

Section 1

Note: Asterisk denotes home team. † denotes overtime.

Section 2

Note: Asterisk denotes home team. † denotes overtime.

Section 3

Note: Asterisk denotes home team. † denotes overtime.

Section 4

Note: Asterisk denotes home team.  † denotes overtime

Semifinals and finals

Note: Asterisk denotes home team

References

Women's National Invitation Tournament
Women's National Invitation Tournament
Women's National Invitation Tournament
Women's National Invitation Tournament
Women's National Invitation Tournament